R/P FLIP (floating instrument platform) is an open ocean research platform owned by the U.S. Office of Naval Research (ONR) and operated by Scripps Institution of Oceanography. When flipped, most of the ballast for the platform is provided by water at depths below the influence of surface waves, hence FLIP is stable and mostly immune to wave action similar to a spar buoy. At the end of a mission, compressed air is pumped into the ballast tanks in the flooded section and the platform, which has no propulsion, returns to its horizontal position so it can be towed to a new location. The platform is frequently mistaken for a capsized ocean transport ship.

History

The Marine Physical Laboratory of Scripps Institution of Oceanography created FLIP with funding from the Office of Naval Research and the assistance of the commercial naval architecture firm The Glosten Associates. FLIP was originally built to support research into the fine-scale phase and amplitude fluctuations in undersea sound waves caused by thermal gradients and sloping ocean bottoms. This acoustic research was conducted as a portion of the Navy's SUBROC program. Development started in January 1960 after a conversation between MPL researcher Frederick H. Fisher and MPL Director Fred N. Spiess regarding stability problems that Fisher was encountering when using the submarine  as a research platform. Spiess recalled a suggestion from Allyn Vine that upending a ship might make it more stable, based on Vine's observation of a Navy mop floating in waves. Fisher was subsequently assigned to work on the feasibility and later development of such a vessel. The Gunderson Brothers Engineering Company in Portland, Oregon, launched FLIP on 22 June 1962.

Capabilities
FLIP is designed to study wave height, acoustic signals, water temperature and density, and for the collection of meteorological data.  Because of the potential interference with the acoustic instruments, FLIP has no means of propulsion.  It must be towed to open water, where it drifts freely or is anchored.

FLIP is 700 gross tons. It carries a crew of five, plus up to eleven scientists. It is capable of operating independently during month-long missions without resupply. It can be operated around the world, although it normally operates off the west coast of the United States from a home base at Scripps' Nimitz Marine Facility in San Diego, California. The ship has specially designed interiors: some fixtures, such as the toilet seats, can flip 90°, and the shower heads are curved 90°. There are overhead lights on the surfaces that are the ceilings in both the towing (horizontal) and flipped orientations.

Gallery

References

External links

 R/P FLIP homepage
 "FLIP - Research Vessel" on Ship-Technology.com
 "The Boat Designed to Capsize" on Damn Interesting

Media
 
 

Research vessels of the United States
Scripps Institution of Oceanography
University-National Oceanographic Laboratory System research vessels
1962 ships
Ships built in Portland, Oregon